Barkla Shop is a small hamlet in mid Cornwall, England, United Kingdom half-a-mile east of St Agnes. It is in the civil parish of Perranzabuloe.

Barkla Shop, located on the road between Perranporth and St Agnes, is named after a blacksmith's shop. When the railway was built rock was brought from the Wheal Liberty quarries by horses, and the blacksmith's shop was important to properly maintain the horses. There was also a carpenter's shop. Both shops are no longer there.

The Mithian post office is located in Barkla.

The Glen Carne Housing and Support organisation has a location in Barkla Shop, for long term housing while homeless men gain training and education, such as in Information Technology or horticulture.

Gallery

References

External links

Hamlets in Cornwall